The 6th Academy Awards were held on March 16, 1934, to honor films released between August 1, 1932 and December 31, 1933, at The Ambassador Hotel in Los Angeles, California.  They were hosted by Will Rogers, who also presented the awards.

When Rogers presented Best Director, he opened the envelope and simply announced, "Come up and get it, Frank!" Frank Capra, certain he was the winner, ran to the podium to collect the Oscar, only to discover Rogers had meant Frank Lloyd, who had won for Cavalcade. Rogers then called the third nominee, George Cukor, to join the two Franks on stage.

A change in the eligibility rules resulted in the longest time frame for which films could be nominated: the seventeen months from August 1, 1932, to December 31, 1933. After this, the eligibility period would coincide with the calendar year.

This was the last time that no film had more than four nominations, as well as the only year in Academy history in which no film other than the Best Picture nominees received multiple nominations. Cavalcade became the fourth film to win Best Picture without a writing nomination, and the last until Hamlet (1948) at the 21st Academy Awards.

Walt Disney became the first person to win consecutive Academy Awards, winning Best Short Subject, Cartoon for The Three Little Pigs after having won the same award the previous year for Flowers and Trees.

Winners and nominees

Nominees were announced on February 26, 1934. Winners are listed first and highlighted in boldface.
{| class=wikitable
|-
| valign="top" width="50%" |

Cavalcade – Winfield Sheehan for Fox Film Co. 
 42nd Street – Darryl F. Zanuck for Warner Bros. 
 A Farewell to Arms – Adolph Zukor for Paramount Publix 
 I Am a Fugitive from a Chain Gang – Hal B. Wallis for Warner Bros. 
 Lady for a Day – Frank Capra for Columbia 
 Little Women – Merian C. Cooper and Kenneth Macgowan for RKO Pictures 
 The Private Life of Henry VIII – Alexander Korda for London Films 
 She Done Him Wrong – William LeBaron for Paramount Publix 
 Smilin' Through – Irving Thalberg for Metro-Goldwyn-Mayer 
 State Fair – Winfield Sheehan for Fox Film Co.
| valign="top" width="50%" |

Frank Lloyd – Cavalcade
 Frank Capra – Lady for a Day
 George Cukor – Little Women
|-
| valign="top" width="50%" |

Charles Laughton – The Private Life of Henry VIII as Henry VIII
 Leslie Howard – Berkeley Square as Peter Standish
 Paul Muni – I Am a Fugitive from a Chain Gang as James Allen
| valign="top" width="50%" |

Katharine Hepburn – Morning Glory as Eva Lovelace May Robson – Lady for a Day as Apple Annie
 Diana Wynyard – Cavalcade as Jane Marryot
|-
| valign="top" width="50%" |'One Way Passage – Robert Lord The Prizefighter and the Lady – Frances Marion
 Rasputin and the Empress – Charles MacArthur
| valign="top" width="50%" |Little Women – Victor Heerman and Sarah Y. Mason, based on the novel by Louisa May Alcott Lady for a Day – Robert Riskin, based on the story "Madame la Gimp" by Damon Runyon
 State Fair – Paul Green and Sonya Levien, based on the novel by Phil Strong 
|-
| valign="top" width="50%" |Cavalcade – William S. Darling A Farewell to Arms – Hans Dreier and Roland Anderson
 When Ladies Meet – Cedric Gibbons
| valign="top" width="50%" |A Farewell to Arms – Charles Lang Reunion in Vienna – George J. Folsey
 Sign of the Cross – Karl Struss
|-
| valign="top" width="50%" |So This Is Harris! –Louis Brock and RKO Pictures Mister Mugg – Warren Doane and Universal Studios
 A Preferred List – Louis Brock and RKO Pictures
| valign="top" width="50%" |Krakatoa – Joe Rock and Educational Pictures Menu – Pete Smith and MGM
 The Sea – Educational Pictures
|-
| valign="top" width="50%" |The Three Little Pigs – Walt Disney and United ArtistsBuilding a Building – Walt Disney and United Artists
The Merry Old Soul – Walter Lantz and Universal Studios
| valign="top" width="50%" |A Farewell to Arms – Franklin Hansen 42nd Street – Nathan Levinson
 Gold Diggers of 1933 – Nathan Levinson
 I Am a Fugitive from a Chain Gang – Nathan Levinson
|-
| valign="top" width="50%" colspan=2|Charles Barton – ParamountScott Beal – UniversalCharles Dorian – MGMFred Fox – United ArtistsGordon Hollingshead – Warner Bros.Dewey Starkey – RKOWilliam Tummel – 20th Century Fox Al Alleborn – Warner Bros.
 Sid Brod – Paramount
 Orville O. Dull – MGM
 Percy Ikerd – 20th Century Fox
 Arthur Jacobson – Paramount
 Edward Killy – RKO
 Joseph A. McDonough – Universal
 William J. Reiter – Universal
 Frank X. Shaw – Warner Bros.
 Ben Silvey – United Artists
 John S. Waters – MGM
|-
|}

 Multiple nominations and awards 

The following eight films received multiple nominations:

 4 nominations: Cavalcade,  A Farewell to Arms and Lady for a Day
 3 nominations: I Am a Fugitive from a Chain Gang and Little Women
 2 nominations: 42nd Street, The Private Life of Henry VIII and State Fair

The following two films received multiple awards:

 3 awards: Cavalcade
 2 awards':  A Farewell to Arms''

Scientific or Technical Awards

Class II Awards 

 Electrical Research Products, Inc. (ERPI)
 For work in sound reproduction.
 RCA Victor Company, Inc.
 For work in sound reproduction.

Class III Awards 

 Fox Film Corporation, Fred Jackman and Warner Brothers Pictures, and Sidney Sanders and RKO Radio Pictures.
 For work in the technologies of cinematography and film projection.

See also 

 1932 in film
 1933 in film

Notes

References

Academy Awards ceremonies
1932 film awards
1933 film awards
1934 in American cinema
1934 in Los Angeles
March 1934 events